Ali-Asghar Sadr Haj Seyyed Javadi (1925–2018) was an Iranian writer, journalist and activist. Politically, he was a dissident to both Pahlavi and Islamic Republic governments.

According to Farhang Rajaee, he was "a leading intellectual of the day".

Early life and education 
He was born in 1925 in Qazvin. In 1951, he obtained a PhD in philosophy from University of Paris.

Career 
During his youth, he was a member of Tudeh Party of Iran but he later became a social democrat. He was an essayist on Islam and Socialism and over a fifteen years period, his gained a large following who were mostly religious laymen. An Iranian Writers Association member, he also wrote for Kayhan.

Mehrdad Mashayekhi argues that he belonged to the Third Worldist current in Iran, and considers him among "radical nationalist intellectuals" who were closely associated with the League of Iranian Socialists. Afshin Matin-Asgari states that he had an "independent socialist background" that he shared with people with Jalal Al-e-Ahmad. He was critical of the U.S. government neocolonialist policies from a Third Worldist perspective, as reflected in his columns published in the 1960s.

In 1977, he was among the members and founders of the newly formed Iranian Committee for the Defense of Freedom and Human Rights (ICDFHR). Mehdi Bazargan was elected as the head and Javadi as the vice head of the committee. He became the head of the ICDFHR after the revolution. However, the committee's office was closed in November 1980, and Javadi had to leave Iran in the fall of 1981.

In 1979, he founded Jonbesh, a relatively small group that belonged to the political center. and ran for a Tehran seat for the Assembly of Experts for Constitution under the banner of Quintuple Coalition. He garnered more votes than any defeated candidate and about one million less than the last elected candidate.

Electoral history

References

20th-century Iranian politicians
1925 births
2018 deaths
Iranian essayists
Iranian expatriates in France
Iranian human rights activists
Iranian political journalists
Iranian Writers Association members
League of Iranian Socialists politicians
Members of the Iranian Committee for the Defense of Freedom and Human Rights
People from Qazvin
Third Force (Iran) politicians
Tudeh Party of Iran members
University of Paris alumni